Plains is a city in Meade County, Kansas, United States. As of the 2020 census, the population of the city was 1,037.

History

Plains was originally called West Plains, and under the latter name was platted in January 1885.

Geography

Climate
According to the Köppen Climate Classification system, Plains has a semi-arid climate, abbreviated "BSk" on climate maps.

Demographics

2010 census
At the 2010 census, there were 1,146 people, 385 households and 310 families residing in the city. The racial makeup of the city was 88.1% White, 0.3% African American, 1.0% Native American, 0.4% Asian, 8.5% from other races, and 1.7% from two or more races. Hispanic or Latino of any race were 36.0% of the population.

There were 385 households, of which 42.9% had children under the age of 18 living with them, 67.3% were married couples living together, 8.3% had a female householder with no husband present, 4.9% had a male householder with no wife present, and 19.5% were non-families. 18.2% of all households were made up of individuals, and 6.5% had someone living alone who was 65 years of age or older. The average household size was 2.98 and the average family size was 3.38.

The median age in the city was 30.9 years. 33.9% of residents were under the age of 18; 8.8% were between the ages of 18 and 24; 25.9% were from 25 to 44; 21.6% were from 45 to 64; and 9.8% were 65 years of age or older. The gender makeup of the city was 51.8% male and 48.2% female.

2000 census
At the 2000 census, there were 1,163 people, 402 households and 303 families residing in the city. The racial makeup of the city was 82.12% White, 1.29% Native American, 14.27% from other races, and 2.32% from two or more races. Hispanic or Latino of any race were 26.23% of the population.

There were 402 households, of which 43.5% had children under the age of 18 living with them, 64.7% were married couples living together, 7.0% had a female householder with no husband present, and 24.4% were non-families. 22.1% of all households were made up of individuals, and 10.7% had someone living alone who was 65 years of age or older. The average household size was 2.89 and the average family size was 3.41.

34.5% of the population were under the age of 18, 10.1% from 18 to 24, 27.6% from 25 to 44, 16.3% from 45 to 64, and 11.6% who were 65 years of age or older. The median age was 28 years. For every 100 females, there were 102.6 males. For every 100 females age 18 and over, there were 101.1 males.

The median household income was $39,688 and the median family income was $44,167. Males had a median income of $31,354 compared with $21,023 for females. The per capita income for the city was $16,047. About 11.4% of families and 13.6% of the population were below the poverty line, including 19.3% of those under age 18 and 0.9% of those age 65 or over.

Education
Plains is a part of USD 483 Southwestern Heights. The district high school, Southwestern Heights, is located between Kismet and Plains. The Southwestern Heights High School mascot is Southwestern Heights Mustangs.

References

Further reading

External links

 Plains - Directory of Public Officials
 USD 483, local school district
 Photos of early Plains
 Plains City Map, KDOT

Cities in Meade County, Kansas
Cities in Kansas